Paul Sargent may refer to:

 Paul Dudley Sargent (1745–1828), privateer and soldier
 Paul Turner Sargent (1880–1946), Illinois artist